Electric boogaloo may refer to:

 Electric boogaloo (dance), a dance style
 The Electric Boogaloos, a street dance crew 
 "Electric Boogaloo" (song), by Ollie & Jerry, 1984
 Breakin' 2: Electric Boogaloo, a 1984 American dance musical film featuring the song
 Five Iron Frenzy 2: Electric Boogaloo, a 2001 album from Five Iron Frenzy
 Electric Boogaloo: The Wild, Untold Story of Cannon Films, a 2014 Australian documentary about The Cannon Group
 "Chardee MacDennis 2: Electric Boogaloo", episode 1 of It's Always Sunny in Philadelphia (season 11), 2016
Electric Boogaloo, a zombie hero in Plants vs. Zombies Heroes

See also 

 Boogaloo (disambiguation)
 "Electric Boogie", a 1976 song
 Boogaloo (funk dance), a freestyle, improvisational street dance movement
 "3rd Acts: ? vs. Scratch 2 ... Electric Boogaloo", a 1999 track by The Roots from Things Fall Apart